Rosendo Chamorro Oreamuno was briefly President of Nicaragua in 1923.
He received a doctorate from the University of Paris.

In 1923, he was Minister of the Interior of Nicaragua. When President Diego Manuel Chamorro died, Rosendo Chamorro was designated interim president until Vice-president Bartolomé Martínez returned to the capital to be sworn in. He held the position of President for fifteen days.

Genealogy 
Rosendo Chamorro Oreamuno was born on 8 February 1862 in Granada to a very wealthy and politically influential family. His father, Dionisio Chamorro Alfaro is brother and half brother respectively to the presidents Pedro Joaquín Chamorro Alfaro and Frutos Chamorro Perez. His grandfather Pedro José Chamorro Argüello was the army general stationed in Granada, Nicaragua.

Rosendo is also first cousin to President Diego Manuel Chamorro Bolaños, and uncle to President Emiliano Chamorro Vargas. He is also Granduncle to Pedro Joaquín Chamorro Cardenal, wife of President Violeta Barrios de Chamorro.

Rosendo married Emilia Solorzano Gutierrez from Granada and had five children:

 Enrique Chamorro Solórzano married to María Carazo Morales, they had five children
 Emilia Chamorro Solórzano married to Rodolfo Vivas de Martini, they had three children
 Amalia Chamorro Solórzano married to William Godfrey
 Rosendo Chamorro Solórzano married to Agustina Benard Guzman, three children, and one child from Dominga Mercado
 Alejandro Chamorro Solórzano married to María Teresa Carazo Morales, they had four children, later married Maria Isabel Cuadra Cardenal and had ten children.

References
 Genealogia Familia Chamorro, por El Dr. Emilio Alvarez Lejarza (1951), Talleres Tipograficos y Litograficos de la Editorial Catolica, S. A. Managua, Nic.-C. A.

Presidents of Nicaragua
Rosendo Chamorro
Interior ministers of Nicaragua
University of Paris alumni
Year of death missing
Nicaraguan expatriates in France